Turn On the Lights may refer to:
Turn On the Lights (album), a 2012 album by Daniel Powter
"Turn On the Lights" (song), a 2012 song by Future